Stefan Sarnowski (1939 – 12 March 2014) was a Polish philosopher working as professor at Kazimierz Wielki University in Bydgoszcz.

Biography 
Stefan Sarnowski graduated from University of Warsaw, and in 1964 obtained his magister degree for the work Marksizm i darwinizm w etyce Kautskiego (Marxism and Darwinism in Kautski’s ethics), with Marek Fritzhand being the supervisor. After receiving his doctorate, Stefan Sarnowski started working as adjunct at the same university.

Publications 
 Zmierzch absolutu? Z problemów filozofii chrześcijańskiej i egzystencjalistycznej (1974);
 Krytyka filozofii metafizycznej (1982);
 Świadomość i czas: o początkach filozofii współczesnej (1985);
 Berkeley: zdrowy rozsądek i idealizm (1988);
 Rozumność i świat - próba wprowadzenia do filozofii (1988);
 O filozofii i metafilozofii (1991);
 Problemy etyki: wybór tekstów (1993; opracowanie);
 Krytyka rozumu pedagogicznego (1993; redakcja);
 Jedność i wielość: zbiór rozpraw (1996; redakcja);
 Wokół Kanta i innych: zbiór rozpraw (1998; redakcja);
 Między filozofią i polityką: platonizm i jego interpretacje (1998);
 Od Platona do współczesności (1999; redakcja);
 Filozofia a polityka (2001);
 Paradoksy i absurdy filozofii (2002);
 O metafilozofii jako filozofii filozofii (2007).

References

External links 
 

1939 births
2014 deaths
20th-century Polish philosophers
George Berkeley scholars
Polish United Workers' Party members
University of Warsaw alumni